is a Near-Earth asteroid with an estimated diameter of around 140 meters. It was discovered in 2015 when it passed  from Earth. The object is not risk-listed.

June 2047 

The nominal 2047 Earth approach is  ±4 days.

See also

References 
 

Near-Earth objects in 2015
Astronomical objects discovered in 2015
Minor planet object articles (unnumbered)
Near-Earth objects removed from the Sentry Risk Table